Chantal Marie Bondin (née Fenech; born 25 March 1980) is a Maltese footballer who plays as a midfielder. She has been a member of the Malta women's national team.

Personal life
Bondin married in December 2012. She has a daughter with her husband.

See also
List of Malta women's international footballers

References

1980 births
Living people
Women's association football midfielders
Maltese women's footballers
People from Birkirkara
Malta women's international footballers
Birkirkara F.C. (women) players